The men's 30 kilometre pursuit at the FIS Nordic World Ski Championships 2011 took place on 27 February 2011 at 12:00 CET at Holmenkollen National Arena. The defending world champion was Norway's Petter Northug while the defending Olympic champion was Sweden's Marcus Hellner.

Results

References

FIS Nordic World Ski Championships 2011